A Fan's Notes is a 1972 Canadian comedy film directed by Eric Till, based on the novel of the same name. It was entered into the 1972 Cannes Film Festival.

Plot
Jerry Orbach plays a middle-aged dreamer and football fan, longs to be someone rich and famous but instead has to come to terms with the fact he can only be a fan, not a player.

Cast
 Jerry Orbach as Fred
 Patricia Collins as Patience
 Burgess Meredith as Mr. Blue
 Rosemary Murphy as Moms
 Conrad Bain as Poppy

Production
The film was shot from 8 September 1970 to 22 January 1971, on a budget of $800,000, with $200,000 coming from the Canadian Film Development Corporation.

Release
A Fan's Notes and The True Nature of Bernadette were the first privately-funded Canadian films shown at the Cannes Film Festival. The film was theatrically released on 29 September 1972, in Toronto.

References

Works cited

External links

1972 films
1972 comedy-drama films
Canadian comedy-drama films
English-language Canadian films
Films about writers
Films based on American novels
Films directed by Eric Till
Films set in New York City
Films set in psychiatric hospitals
Films shot in New York City
Films shot in Toronto
Warner Bros. films
1970s English-language films
1970s Canadian films